Casina is a comune (municipality) in the Province of Reggio Emilia in the Italian region Emilia-Romagna, located about  west of Bologna and about  southwest of Reggio Emilia.  

The municipality of Casina contains the frazioni (subdivisions, mainly villages and hamlets) Banzola, Barazzone, Beleo, Bergogno, Bettola, Bocco, Boschi, Braglio, Brugna, Casaleo, Casetico, Castignola, Ciolla, Cortogno, Costaferrata, Crocicchio, Faieto, Giandeto Straduzzi, Il Monte, La Ripa, Leguigno Faggeto, Lezzolo, L'Incrostolo, Migliara-Boastra, Molino di Cortogno, Monchio l'Axella, Montale, Montata, Paullo Chiesa, Sordiglio, Strada-Fabbrica, Trazara, and Villa Bonini.

Casina borders the following municipalities: Carpineti, Castelnovo ne' Monti, Canossa, Vezzano sul Crostolo, Viano.

The restored Oratorio di Beleo is located in the frazione of Beleo.

Twin towns
Casina is twinned with:

  Fritzlar, Germany

References

External links
 Official website

Cities and towns in Emilia-Romagna